Justice Sohrab Peshotan Kotval (September 1910 – 6 March 1987) served as Chief Justice of the Bombay High Court from 1 August 1966 – 27 September 1972.

He took his education at St. Joseph's Convent, Nagpur and later at Billimoria High School, Panchgani. He graduated from Morris College (now known as Nagpur Mahavidyalaya) and got his LL.B. from the University College of Law at Nagpur.

He practised at the Bar at Nagpur since 1932 and practised in the Nagpur and later Madhya Pradesh High Courts as well as in the Federal Court and the Supreme Court. On the reorganization of the States in 1956, he used to sit as Judge on the Nagpur Bench of the Bombay High Court.

References

External links
 Brief biography at Bombay High Court

Scholars from Nagpur
Judges of the Bombay High Court
Chief Justices of the Bombay High Court
20th-century Indian judges
1910 births
1987 deaths